The Polar Express is a 2004 American computer-animated Christmas fantasy adventure film directed by Robert Zemeckis, who co-wrote the screenplay with William Broyles Jr., based on the 1985 children's picture book of the same name by Chris Van Allsburg. It stars Tom Hanks in multiple distinct roles, with Daryl Sabara, Nona Gaye, Jimmy Bennett, and Eddie Deezen in supporting roles. The film features human characters animated using live-action and motion-capture computer-animated animation. It tells the story of a young boy who, on Christmas Eve, sees a mysterious train bound for the North Pole stop outside his window and is invited aboard by its conductor. The boy joins several other children as they embark on a journey to visit Santa Claus preparing for Christmas.

The Polar Express was released in the Chicago International Film Festival on October 13, 2004 and the United States on November 10, 2004, by Warner Bros. Pictures. The film received generally positive reviews from critics, but originally underperformed at the box office, grossing $286 million against a record-breaking $165–170 million budget, the biggest sum for an animated feature at the time. However, later re-releases helped propel the film's gross to $314 million worldwide. The film was later listed in the 2006 Guinness World Records as the first all-digital capture film. The film also marks Michael Jeter's last acting role before his death, and the film was thus dedicated to his memory.

Plot

On Christmas Eve in the 1950s, a passenger train known as the Polar Express stops at the Grand Rapids, Michigan house of a boy who is growing skeptical about the existence of Santa Claus. The conductor says the train is traveling to the North Pole, and the boy, although reluctant at first, climbs aboard and meets a spirited girl and a know-it-all boy. The train then stops to pick up a boy named Billy, who initially declines to board, but changes his mind as the train is leaving. The boy applies the emergency brake and Billy is allowed on, but he has to sit alone in the observation car. The children are then served hot chocolate by a platoon of dancing waiters, and the girl saves a cup for Billy. 

When the conductor and the girl go to give Billy his cup, the boy notices that the girl's ticket has not yet been validated and tries to return it to her. In doing so, the wind blows the ticket out into the wilderness, but it soon finds its way back to the train. After the girl discovers that her ticket is missing, the conductor leaves with her. Assuming that she will be thrown off the train, the boys finds the ticket and traverses the rooftops to find the girl. There, he encounters a mysterious ghostly hobo that helps him reach the engine. The boy finds that the girl has been put in charge while the engineer and fireman are replacing the engine's headlight. As the train continues, it moves at an extreme speed due to the cotter pin shearing off. Once they reach a frozen lake, the cotter pin is replaced and the driver narrowly gets the train back onto the tracks as the ice breaks.

The conductor takes the boy and girl back to their seats and they join Billy in the observation car. The train arrives at the North Pole, where the conductor announces that one of the children will be chosen to receive the first gift of Christmas from Santa himself. While the girl and boy attempt to convince Billy to join them, the boy accidentally uncouples the car, sending it hurtling along a route towards a railway turntable inside Santa's workshop. The children make their way through an elf command center and a gift-sorting office facility, where Billy finds a present in his name. They are dumped into a giant sack of presents, where they also find the know-it-all boy. After the sack is loaded onto Santa's sleigh, the elves escort them out before Santa and his reindeer arrive.

A bell flies loose from the galloping reindeer's reins; the boy initially cannot hear it ring, until he finds it within himself to believe. He returns the bell to Santa, who selects him to receive the first gift of Christmas. Santa agrees to let him keep the bell. As the children board to go home, the boy discovers that he lost the bell through a hole in his pocket. The boy arrives home, and the conductor wishes him a Merry Christmas. He awakens on Christmas morning to find a present containing his lost bell with a note from Santa. He and his younger sister Sarah joyfully ring the bell, but their parents do not hear it because they do not believe in Santa. The boy reflects on his friends and sister eventually growing deaf to the bell over the years as their belief faded. However, despite the fact he is now an adult, the bell still rings for him, as it does "for all who truly believe."

Voice cast

 Tom Hanks as Hero Boy (Chris) (adult voice and motion-capture), Hero Boy's father, Conductor (James), Hobo, Santa Claus, and Ebenezer Scrooge puppet
 Josh Hutcherson as Hero Boy (additional motion-capture)
  Daryl Sabara as Hero Boy (child voice)
 Nona Gaye as Hero Girl (Holly)
 Darrian O Driscoll as Hero Girl (additional motion-capture)
 Meagan Moore as Hero Girl (singing voice)
 Tinashe as Hero Girl (motion-capture model)
 Peter Scolari as Billy the Lonely Boy (motion-capture)
 Hayden McFarland as Billy the Lonely Boy (additional motion-capture)
 Jimmy Bennett as Billy the Lonely Boy (voice)
 Matthew Hall as Billy the Lonely Boy (singing voice)
 Eddie Deezen as Know-it-all (Lenny)
 Jimmy Pinchak as Know-it-all (additional motion-capture)
 Michael Jeter as Smokey and Steamer (voice)
 André Sogliuzzo as Smokey and Steamer (additional voice)
 Leslie Zemeckis as Sister Sarah (motion-capture) and Hero Boy's mother
 Isabella Peregrina as Sister Sarah (voice)
 Ashly Holloway as Sister Sarah (additional motion-capture)
 Dylan Cash as Boy on Train (voice)
 Brendan King and Andy Pellick as Pastry Chefs
 Josh Eli, Rolandas Hendricks, Jon Scott, Sean Scott, Mark Mendonca, Mark Goodman, Gregory Gast, and Gordon Hart as Waiters
 Julene Renee as Red Head Girl and an Elf
 Chris Coppola as Gus the Toothless Boy and an Elf
 Connor Matheus as Toothless Boy (additional motion-capture)
 Phil Fondacaro, Debbie Lee Carrington, Mark Povinelli, and Ed Gale as Elves
 Charles Fleischer as Elf General
 Steven Tyler as Elf Lieutenant and Elf Singer

Production

Development
Hanks optioned the book in 1999 with the hopes of playing the conductor and Santa Claus. One of the conditions of the sale was that the resulting film not be animated. Zemeckis, however, felt that a live-action version was unfeasible, claiming that it "would look awful, and it would be impossible – it would cost $1 billion instead of $160 million." Zemeckis felt that such a version would rob the audience of the art style of the book which he felt was "so much a part of the emotion of the story". The two acquired the rights to the book the following year. In order to keep his vision a new process was created by which actors would be filmed with motion capture equipment in a black box stage which would then be animated to make the resulting film. Hanks stated that this method of working was "actually a return to a type of acting that acting in films does not allow you to do", comparing the process to performing a play in the round. The idea of a Scrooge puppet was conceived when Zemeckis looked at his toys he used to have, one of which was a puppet.

Hanks plays five roles in the film including that of a small child (whose voice would later be dubbed in by Daryl Sabara). Initially Zemeckis considered having him play every role, but after trying this, Hanks grew exhausted, and they whittled down the number.

Principal photography
Principal photography of the motion-capture sequences began in June 2003, and wrapped in May 2004.

Soundtrack

The soundtrack of the film, titled The Polar Express: Original Motion Picture Soundtrack, was released on November 2, 2004 by Reprise Records, Warner Music Group and Warner Sunset Records. The song, "Believe", written by Glen Ballard and Alan Silvestri, was nominated for Best Original Song at the 77th Academy Awards. It was sung at the 77th Academy Awards show by original performer Josh Groban with Beyoncé. It gained a Grammy Award in 2006.

The album was certified Gold by the RIAA in November 2007. Having sold 724,000 copies in the United States, it is the best-selling film soundtrack/holiday album hybrid since Nielsen SoundScan started tracking music sales in 1991.

Most of the original orchestral score featured in the film was not released on the soundtrack and has never been released. The soundtrack mostly comprises only songs featured in the film. A limited number of promotional "For Your Consideration" CDs, intended to showcase the film's score to reviewers of the film, were released in 2005. This CD contained nearly the complete score, but none of the film's songs. Various bootleg versions of the soundtrack, combining both the official soundtrack album and the orchestral-only CD, have since surfaced.

Architecture

The buildings at the North Pole refer to a number of buildings related to American railroading history.  The buildings in the square at the city's center are loosely based on the Pullman Factory in Chicago's Pullman neighborhood.

The Polar Express Locomotive

The locomotive featured in the film is an American 2-8-4 Berkshire type steam locomotive modeled after the Pere Marquette 1225, which had spent many years on static display near Spartan Stadium in East Lansing, Michigan on the campus of Michigan State University, where Chris Van Allsburg recalled playing on the engine when attending football games as a child. The engine in the movie, however, has noticeable differences from the real Pere Marquette 1225, and looks somewhat like an S-1 from the Erie Railroad. These include the headlight being mounted inside the smokebox, like many Delaware & Hudson steam locomotives, instead of being on a platform or on the pilot. The whistle is mounted on the upper right hand side of the boiler positioned upright, instead of on top of the boiler, positioned horizontally. It also lacks the feedwater heater, marker lights, number boards, and builders plates the real Pere Marquette 1225 has. The cow catcher is also bigger than it is in real life, with slats extending to the pilot beam, and it also lacks a front coupler.

In July 2002, Warner Bros. approached the locomotive's owner, the Steam Railroading Institute, to study the engine. The engine in the film is modeled from the PM No. 1225's drawings and the sounds from recordings made of the 1225 operating under steam.

Marketing

Video game

A video game based on the film was released on November 2, 2004 for GameCube, Game Boy Advance, PlayStation 2 and Windows, developed by Blue Tongue Entertainment and published by THQ. The plot of the game is somewhat different than the film version. Within the game, the Ebenezer Scrooge puppet—who is set as the main antagonist of the game—attempts to prevent the children from believing in Santa Claus by stealing their tickets and trying to prevent the children from making it to the North Pole.

Toy trains
Model railroad builder Lionel continues to make Polar Express train sets and equipment, including locomotives, traincars, and trackside buildings.

Train trips

The film has also spawned multiple real-world holiday train-travel experiences based loosely on the film's train journey all over the United States, as well as Canada, and even the United Kingdom under license from Rail Events Inc.
 
These include the Polar Express train ride held at the Grand Canyon Railway, the Polar Express Train Ride of the Great Smoky Mountains Railroad, the Polar Express Train Ride of the Texas State Railroad, The Polar Express Train Ride in Whippany, New Jersey, and The Polar Express Train Ride at Aspen Crossing.  The Pere Marquette 1225 itself pulls a similarly-themed Christmas train, albeit under the name of the North Pole Express.

The UK's first Polar Express train rides were hosted on the Dartmoor Railway and the Weardale Railway which were both owned by the company British American Railway Services. These services were all diesel hauled, however in 2016, Telford Steam Railway became the first UK line to run the Polar Express with steam, powered by one of two American-built S160 2-8-0 locomotive's No's. 5197 & 6046 courtesy of Churnet Valley Railway in Staffordshire.  

 PNP Events' Polar Express Train Rides in Oxfordshire (Cholsey and Wallingford Railway), the Yorkshire Dales (Wensleydale Railway), South Devon (South Devon Railway) and Royal Tunbridge Wells (Spa Valley Railway). The Polar Express Train Ride also operates on the Mid-Norfolk Railway, and the Seaton Tramway operate the "Polar Express Tram Ride".

Alongside the steam operated Polar Express trains run at numerous Heritage Railway's over the UK, Vintage Trains run their trains on the UK Mainline Network. Their trains have been operated with a selection of steam locomotives which has included Great Western 4-6-0 Hall class No. 4965 Rood Ashton Hall for the ride, albeit being renamed Polar Star (this name was originally worn by 4005 "Polar Star" & later 70026 "Polar Star"), as of 2022 these trains still run with their latest programme of trains being hauled by Great Western 4-6-0 Castle Class No. 7029 Clun Castle. These trains run between Birmingham Moor Street and Dorridge.

Concert presentations
In 2021, CineConcerts in partnership with Warner Bros. Consumer Products presented The Polar Express in Concert, being symphony hall showings of the movie backed by a live symphony orchestra and choir.

The Polar Express Experience
In November 2007, SeaWorld Orlando debuted the Polar Express Experience, a motion simulator ride based on the film. The attraction was a temporary replacement for the Wild Arctic attraction. The building housing the attraction was also temporarily re-themed to a railroad station and ride vehicles painted to resemble Polar Express passenger cars. The plot for the ride revolves around a trip to the North Pole on Christmas Eve. Guests feel the motion of the locomotive as well as the swinging of the train on ice and feeling of ice crumbling beneath them. The attraction was available until January 1, 2008, and was open annually during the Christmas season. 2015 was the final year of operation for the Polar Express Experience and Wild Arctic has since operated on a year-round schedule.

The 4D film, distributed by SimEx-Iwerks, has been shown at other amusement parks around the world including Cincinnati Zoo and Botanical Garden, Stone Mountain, Dollywood (during the annual Smoky Mountain Christmas event), Vancouver Aquarium (2009—2010).

Release

Theatrical
The Polar Express premiered at the 40th Chicago International Film Festival on October 21, 2004.  It opened on November 7 and went into wide distribution on November 10. In addition to standard theatrical 35mm format, a 3-D version for IMAX was also released, generated from the same CGI digital models used for the 2-D version.

Home media
The film was released on DVD as separated widescreen and full-screen versions in single and two-disc special editions (with bonus features) and on VHS on November 22, 2005, one year after the film originally came out in theaters. It was released on HD-DVD with bonus features in 2006 and on Blu-ray with bonus features on October 30, 2007, both presented in the original widescreen aspect ratio. It was also released in Anaglyph 3D Blu-ray and DVD on October 28, 2008, labeled as "The Polar Express: Presented in 3-D". This version includes an Anaglyph Version of the Film and the Original Theatrical Presentation. The film was later released to Blu-ray 3D on November 16, 2010, and to Ultra HD Blu-ray on November 1, 2022.

Reception

Box office
The film opened at #2 behind The Incredibles, and earned $23.3 million from approximately 7,000 screens at 3,650 theaters, for a per-theater average of $6,390 and a per-screen average of $3,332 in its opening weekend. It also brought in a total of $30.6 million since its Wednesday launch. The weekend total also included $2.1 million from 59 IMAX theaters, for an IMAX theater average of $35,593, and had a $3,000,000 take since Wednesday. According to president Dan Fellman, Titanic had put a different spin on the numbers for The Polar Express. Among holiday movies, The Santa Clause 2 opened in 2002 to $29 million and grossed $140 million, while Elf debuted the next year at $31 million on its way to a $175-million take. The studio had high hopes for the movie, particularly since Zemeckis and Hanks had a history of success with Forrest Gump and Cast Away. By comparison from the weekend the previous year, the top 12 movies had taken in $136.1 million down to 5% following the debuts of The Matrix Revolutions, Brother Bear and Elf. Since Harry Potter and the Sorcerer's Stone was released in 2001, Warner Bros. had released 10 major films and all of them had dropped off at least 36% in their second weekend, but only seven dropped off at least 49%. Not one of them had a lower three-day opening weekend total gross as The Polar Express itself. The overseas prospects for the film were not especially encouraging, even though The Last Samurai went on to make a considerable sum of money across the globe and was prematurely labeled a flop by the media. In its second weekend, The Polar Express dropped to 33%, and grossing $15.7 million, averaging $4,293 from 3,650 venues and boosting the 12-day cumulative gross to $51.5 million. In its third weekend, which was Thanksgiving weekend, the film increased by 24%, earning $19.4 million, averaging $5,312 from 3,650 venues and raising the 19-day cumulative gross to $81.5 million. With a total gross of $71 million, The Polar Express would hold the record for having the highest IMAX gross of any film until it was taken by Avatar five years later in 2009. The film has made $187.9 million in North America, and $126.3 million overseas for a total worldwide gross of $314.2 million (including all re-releases).

Critical response
  The Independent reported in 2011 that the film "is now seen by many as a classic". Audiences polled by CinemaScore gave the film a rare average grade of "A+" on an A+ to F scale.

Roger Ebert gave the film his highest rating of four stars, saying, "There's a deeper, shivery tone, instead of the mindless jolliness of the usual Christmas movie", and "it has a haunting, magical quality". Acknowledging comments by other reviewers, Ebert said, "It's a little creepy. Not creepy in an unpleasant way, but in that sneaky, teasing way that lets you know eerie things could happen." Richard Roeper and Mick LaSalle also gave highly positive reviews to the film, with the former saying that it "remains true to the book, right down to the bittersweet final image" and the latter giving it his highest rating of five stars, calling it, "an enchanting, beautiful and brilliantly imagined film that constitutes a technological breakthrough." James Berardinelli gave the film 3.5 out of 4 stars, stating that it is "a delightful tale guaranteed to enthrall viewers of all ages", and ranked it as the 10th best film of 2004, tying with The Incredibles. Ian Nathan of Empire Magazine gave the film three out of five stars, and said, "For all the fairy-lit wonder, some will rail at the idea of Back to the Futures director dabbling with such a schmaltzy tale. Cynics will sneeze in shock; children will cuddle up and dream along." Peter Bradshaw of The Guardian also gave the film three out of five stars, saying, "After a promising and distinctive start, a railway adventure to meet Santa runs off the rails."

The character design and animation were criticized for dipping into the uncanny valley. Peter Travers of Rolling Stone gave the film 1 star out of 4, and called it "a failed and lifeless experiment in which everything goes wrong". Stephanie Zacharek of Salon gave the film 1.5 stars out of 5 and said, "I could probably have tolerated the incessant jitteriness of The Polar Express if the look of it didn't give me the creeps." Geoff Pevere of the Toronto Star stated, "If I were a child, I'd have nightmares. Come to think of it, I did anyway." Paul Clinton from CNN called it "at best disconcerting, and at worst, a wee bit horrifying". Manohla Dargis of The New York Times gave the film 1.5 stars out of 5 and wrote, "There's no way of knowing whether they drank the company Kool-Aid. Still, from the looks of The Polar Express it's clear that, together with Mr. Zemeckis, this talented gang has on some fundamental level lost touch with the human aspect of film."

Accolades
The film was nominated at the 77th Academy Awards in the categories of Best Sound Editing (Randy Thom and Dennis Leonard), Best Sound Mixing (Randy Thom, Tom Johnson, Dennis S. Sands and William B. Kaplan), and Best Original Song for "Believe" (music and lyrics by Glen Ballard and Alan Silvestri), but lost all three to The Incredibles, Ray, and The Motorcycle Diaries respectively. The film was nominated at the 3rd Visual Effects Society Awards in the category of "Outstanding Performance by an Animated Character in an Animated Motion Picture."

In 2008, the American Film Institute nominated The Polar Express for its Top 10 Animated Films list.

See also
 List of Christmas films
 Santa Claus in film
 The Little Engine That Could - a 1991 animated short

References

Further reading

External links
 
 
 
 

2004 films
2004 computer-animated films
2000s English-language films
2004 3D films
3D animated films
2000s American animated films
American fantasy adventure films
2000s fantasy adventure films
2000s Christmas films
2000s children's animated films
American 3D films
American Christmas films
American computer-animated films
American children's animated fantasy films
Animated Christmas films
Animated films about trains
Animated films based on children's books
American ghost films
Films based on works by Chris Van Allsburg
Christmas adventure films
Films set in Michigan
Films set in Canada
Films set in the Arctic
Films set on trains
Films set in the 1950s
IMAX films
Films using motion capture
Santa Claus in film
Films directed by Robert Zemeckis
Films produced by Gary Goetzman
Films with screenplays by Robert Zemeckis
Films scored by Alan Silvestri
Films about elves
ImageMovers films
Playtone films
Shangri-La Entertainment films
Castle Rock Entertainment films
Warner Bros. animated films
Culture of Grand Rapids, Michigan
Films produced by Robert Zemeckis
Animated films about children